Rhythm City was a South African musical drama series produced by Quizzical Pictures. It is an e.tv original production that premiered on the country's free-to-air television channel e.tv on 9 July 2007 to 16 July 2021 as a replacement for the now-defunct youth-targeted soap opera, Backstage, on weekdays at 19:00. The story revolves around the trials and tribulations of those who are trying to break into the music industry. The series also airs on e.tv Ghana.

Rhythm City starred Mduduzi Mabaso, Mpho Molepo, Setlhabi Taunyane, Tebogo Khalo, Mapula Mafole, Jesse Suntele, Ishmael Songo, Itumeleng Bokaba, Slindile Nodangala, Kamogelo Molatlhoe, Tshiamo Molobi, Oros Mampofu, Linda Sokhulu, Nompilo Gwala, Patronella Tshuma and Mcedisi Shabangu. The series has co-stars includes Mzamo Gcabashe, Nomsizi Williams, Sandile Dlamini, Kealeboga Masango, Mbalenhle Zakwe and Menzi Brighton Biyela. The best supporting cast was Bohlokwa Larona Mpiti, Sannah Mchunu and Tebogo Mohale Motaung.

Main cast

Production team
Current front credits of the show cite Rolie Nikiwe & Neil McCarthy as Creators. Harriet Gavshon is the Executive Producer while Eric Mogale serves as the Creative Director. Zelipa Zulu is the Head Writer and the Series Producer is Yula Quinn.

End credits for the production department credit Vincent Nkomo as the Box Producer. Kamohelo Emeli Mokoena is the Production Manager while Flo Maluleka serves as the Production Co-ordinator. Kgomotso Ditshwene is responsible for casting as the Casting Director. Patricia Boyer is the Performance Coah. The Production Accountant is Mthokozeleni Sibisi and Ntomboxolo Ndou is the Accounts Assistant. Tracey Engelbrecht is the series’ Production Scheduler. Thabani Mkhize and Lydia Hlongwe are the Production Runner and Receptionist respectively. Tim Greene was responsible for the opening title sequence, and Tumelo Mohlala is responsible for the Music and Publicity. Terezin Mnisi, Grace Baloi and Bellah Gxowa are responsible for Hospitality.

Original main credits since the show's inception included Rolisizwe Nikiwe (Creative director), Beatmaker (Musical director), Neil McCarthy (Head Writer), Andre Odendaal, Heather Gordon, and Ziggy Hofmeyr (Directors), Anthony Shaw (Producer), Anthony Akerman (Script Editor & Writer), Rosalind Butler, and Richard Beynon (Storyliners) as well as Makgano Mamabolo, Lodi Matsetela, Justine Loots, and Zamo Mkhwanazi (Writers). Former writers also include, Charlie Sapadin (Head Writer), Napo Masheane (Storyliner), Chris Q. Radebe (Storyliner & Writer), Eddie Thaba (Storyliner & Writer), Kelton Sinyosi (Storyliner), Zoë Arthur (Storyliner & Writer), Sibongile Nkosana (Storyliner & Writer), Emma Delius (Storyliner), Tshabalira Lebakeng (Storyliner), Tshego Monaisa (Storyliner), Wilmien Rossouw (Story Editor & Writer), Gillian Breslin (Script Editor) and Craig Higginson (Script Editor & Writer).

Current credits to the script department cite Zelipa Zulu as the Head Writer. Nina da Silva doubles up as the Script Manager & Editor and the Script Coordinator is Godfrey Silumko Nkonzo. Tefo Magengenene is the Translator & Sub Titler while Banele Mtebele is the Zulu & Xhosa Translator. The Story Liners as per current rolling credits are Darrel Bristow-Bovey, Christian Blomkamp & Charleen Ntsane. Craig Freimond oversees the storylining team as the Content Editor. The series’ scriptwriters are Darrel Bristow-Bovey, Thishiwe Ziqubu, Nonzi Bogatsu, Zelipa Zulu, Christian Blomkamp, Charleen Ntsane, Byron Abrahams, Sinethemba Keleku, Craig Freimond, Godfrey Silumko Nkonzo and Nina da Silva.

Rhythm City airs at 19:00 Monday to Friday on etv HD. Dstv channel 194.

Cancellation
e.tv had announced that the series will air its final episode on July 16, 2021 with a new local drama taking up its spot. besides a new local drama taking up its spot, there was no other reason placed.

References

External links

South African television soap operas
E.tv original programming
2000s South African television series
2010s South African television series
2007 South African television series debuts